In algebraic number theory, the narrow class group of a number field K is a refinement of the class group of K that takes into account some information about embeddings of K into the field of real numbers.

Formal definition 

Suppose that K is a finite extension of Q. Recall that the ordinary class group of K is defined to be

where IK is the group of fractional ideals of K, and PK is the group of principal fractional ideals of K, that is, ideals of the form aOK where a is an element of K.

The narrow class group is defined to be the quotient

where now PK+ is the group of totally positive principal fractional ideals of K; that is, ideals of the form aOK where a is an element of K such that σ(a) is positive for every embedding

Uses 

The narrow class group features prominently in the theory of representing of integers by quadratic forms. An example is the following result (Fröhlich and Taylor, Chapter V, Theorem 1.25).

Theorem. Suppose that

where d is a square-free integer, and that the narrow class group of K is trivial. Suppose that

is a basis for the ring of integers of K. Define a quadratic form
 ,
where NK/Q is the norm. Then a prime number p is of the form
 
for some integers x and y if and only if either
 
or
 
or

where dK is the discriminant of K, and

indicates the Legendre symbol.

Examples 

For example, one can prove that the quadratic fields Q(), Q(), Q() all have trivial narrow class group. Then, by choosing appropriate bases for the integers of each of these fields, the above theorem implies the following:
 A prime p is of the form p = x2 + y2 for integers x and y if and only if

 (This is known as Fermat's theorem on sums of two squares.)
 A prime p is of the form p = x2 − 2y2 for integers x and y if and only if

 A prime p is of the form p = x2 − xy + y2 for integers x and y if and only if
 (cf. Eisenstein prime)

An example that illustrates the difference between the narrow class group and the usual class group is the case of Q().  This has trivial class group, but its narrow class group has order 2.  Because the class group is trivial, the following statement is true:
 A prime p or its inverse –p is of the form ± p = x2 - 6y2 for integers x and y if and only if

However, this statement is false if we focus only on p and not -p (and is in fact even false for p = 2), because the narrow class group is nontrivial.  The statement that classifies the positive p is the following:
 A prime p is of the form p = x2 - 6y2 for integers x and y if and only if p = 3 or

(Whereas the first statement allows primes , the second only allows primes .)

See also 

 Class group
 Quadratic form

References 

 A. Fröhlich and M. J. Taylor, Algebraic Number Theory (p. 180), Cambridge University Press, 1991.

Algebraic number theory